Prince Friedrich Wilhelm Ludwig Alexander of Prussia (21 June 1820 – 4 January 1896) was the eldest child of Prince Frederick of Prussia and his wife, Princess Luise of Anhalt-Bernburg.

Early biography

Military career
Alexander joined the army at a young age, and was attached to the headquarters of Crown Prince Frederick William during the Austro-Prussian War. During the morning of the decisive battle of Königgrätz, a humorous account recounted that while on his horse, it ran away; Alexander was found later in the afternoon seated on the horse in a neighboring wood, stating that his horse had insisted on going there.

He served as a general of infantry in the Prussian army. He was also a chief of the Third West Infantry Regiment and chief of the Second Regiment of Grenadiers of the Guard in the Landwehr.

Later years
In 1891, Alexander ended his cure at Marienbad and embarked for Ostend for three to four weeks.

A contemporary figure once recounted that:
"The charitable disposition of Prince Alexander of Prussia, the Emperor's cousin... is so well-known and often so appealed to in Berlin, that his secretary must have acquired great experience in answering begging questions. He passes the greater part of the year in Switzerland and at Burg Rheinstein, his castle on the Rhine".

Traveling in Switzerland, Alexander liked to stay under the title Count de Tecklenburg. He was described as an "extraordinary pedestrian", because he "accomplished in twelve hours what the best walker in the valley takes sixteen hours to perform". In November 1852, Alexander went to visit his very ill friend the Duchess of Orleans at her estate at Lausanne, Switzerland, though she survived for six more years.

Death and legacy
In late December 1895, Alexander was reported to be "critically ill". He died at a quarter to eleven on 4 January 1896 after ailing for some time. The Emperor and Empress were at his bedside when he died. On 9 January, Alexander's funeral was held in a Berlin cathedral. Members of the Imperial court attended, including the Emperor and Empress, Dowager Empress Frederick, as well as members of the diplomatic corps and the Bundesrat, and a number of generals from the Germany army. His death sent the Berlin court into mourning for a month, causing the planned season's functions and court festivities to be altered. Hunting excursions prearranged for the month were also canceled. Some of the members of his entourage received quite substantial legacies, but the rest of his estate passed to his younger brother Prince George of Prussia, and after his death, to Alexander's godchild Prince Oskar of Prussia.

Much was written about Alexander's supposedly promiscuous ways. In her 1915 work Memories of forty years, Catherine Radziwill recalled that:
"[Prince Alexander], though none too intelligent, was extremely fond of society, feminine society in particular. I remember that one day, at my mother-in-law's house, he managed to decoy into an empty room a certain Madame von Wildenbruch, the wife of an illegitimate son of Prince Louis Ferdinand of Prussia, and began kissing her with fervour, to the extreme stupefaction and anger of the lady in question, who, it must be added, was at that time nearly seventy years of age".

Despite never marrying, another source said Alexander declared marriage to every woman he met, "no matter if she be princess or laundress, octogenarian or young girl, married or single".

Honours
He received the following orders and decorations:

Ancestry

References

1820 births
1896 deaths
House of Hohenzollern
Prussian princes
Generals of Infantry (Prussia)
Recipients of the Order of St. Anna, 1st class
Burials at Berlin Cathedral
Military personnel from Berlin